Stuart C. Sealfon, M.D., is an American neurologist who studies the mechanisms of both the therapeutic and adverse effects of drugs. He was an early adopter of the use of massively parallel qPCR and fluorescent in situ hybridization to characterize cell response state and his research accomplishments have included the identification of the primary structure of the gonadotropin-releasing hormone receptor, finding new signaling pathways activated by drugs for Parkinson's disease, elucidating the mechanism of action of hallucinogens and finding a new brain receptor complex implicated in schizophrenia as a novel target for antipsychotics.

Sealfon is the Glickenhaus Professor and Chairman of the Department of Neurology at The Mount Sinai School of Medicine in New York City. Sealfon also serves as director of Mount Sinai's Center for Translational Systems Biology. Additionally, he is both Professor of Neurobiology and Professor of Pharmacology and Systems Therapeutics.

Sealfon is the author of multiple book chapters and is the editor of Receptor Molecular Biology, Volume 25. He has contributed to more than 100 original research articles and holds two patents.

Biography
Sealfon was born in 1956 in New York City. He was raised in Rockaway. He graduated magna cum laude Phi Beta Kappa from Princeton University in 1978 and received the thesis award in comparative literature. He received his M.D. in 1982 from Columbia University College of Physicians and Surgeons, where he was selected to the Alpha Omega Alpha Honor Medical Society. He completed an internship in medicine in 1983 and a residency in neurology in 1986 at Massachusetts General Hospital. After completing a fellowship in neuroscience at the Mount Sinai Medical Center, he was named assistant professor at the Mount Sinai School of Medicine in 1988.

Sealfon has served on the editorial boards of Endocrinology, Endocrine Journal, Molecular Endocrinology and the Mount Sinai Journal of Medicine and served as reviewing editor of Biochemical Journal. Additionally, he served on the advisory board of the Alanex Corporation.

Sealfon's work is supported by the National Institute on Drug Abuse, the National Institute of Diabetes and Digestive and Kidney Diseases and the National Institute of Allergy and Infectious Diseases. He directs the multi-institutional Program for Research on Immune Modeling and Experimentation (PRIME), an NIH-funded Modeling Immunity for the Biodefense Center. Through the Sealfon Laboratory and The Mount Sinai Medical Center, he oversees research on human hallucinogenic drugs of abuse, immune cell signaling, and gonadotrope signaling.

Sealfon's daughter Rebecca won the 1997 Scripps National Spelling Bee.

Grants
A partial list of current grant support includes the following: 
GnRH Receptor Signaling Specificity, NIH, RO1 DK46943-14
Mechanisms of Hallucinogens, NIH, PO1 DA12923-07
Modeling Immunity for Biodefense, NO1 AI 50021

Patents
1998, U.S. #5,750,366, Cloning and Expression of Gonadotropin Releasing Hormone Receptor 
1999, U.S. #5,985,583, Applications of GnRH Receptor

Publications
Partial list:

References

External links
The Mount Sinai Hospital homepage
The Mount Sinai School of Medicine homepage

1956 births
American neurologists
Columbia University Vagelos College of Physicians and Surgeons alumni
Icahn School of Medicine at Mount Sinai faculty
Princeton University alumni
Living people